In computational complexity theory, the exponential hierarchy is a hierarchy of complexity classes that is an exponential time analogue of the polynomial hierarchy. As elsewhere in complexity theory, “exponential” is used in two different meanings (linear exponential bounds  for a constant c, and full exponential bounds ), leading to two versions of the exponential hierarchy. This hierarchy is sometimes also referred to as the weak exponential hierarchy, to differentiate it from the strong exponential hierarchy.

EH
The complexity class EH is the union of the classes  for all k, where  (i.e., languages computable in nondeterministic time  for some constant c with a  oracle). One also defines 

 and 

An equivalent definition is that a language L is in  if and only if it can be written in the form

where  is a predicate computable in time  (which implicitly bounds the length of yi). Also equivalently, EH is the class of languages computable on an alternating Turing machine in time  for some c with constantly many alternations.

EXPH
EXPH is the union of the classes , where  (languages computable in nondeterministic time  for some constant c with a  oracle), and again:

 

A language L is in  if and only if it can be written as

where  is computable in time  for some c, which again implicitly bounds the length of yi. Equivalently, EXPH is the class of languages computable in time  on an alternating Turing machine with constantly many alternations.

Comparison

E ⊆ NE ⊆ EH⊆  ESPACE, 
EXP ⊆ NEXP ⊆ EXPH⊆ EXPSPACE, 
EH ⊆ EXPH.

References

External links

Complexity classes